Emil Jakobsen (born 24 January 1998) is a Danish handball player for SG Flensburg-Handewitt and the Danish national team.

He represented Denmark at the 2021 World Men's Handball Championship.

Achievements 

 Top Scorer at the 2020–21 EHF European League (96 goals)
 All-Star Team as Best Left wing Danish League: 2019–20, 2020–21
 All-Star Team as Best Left Wing at the 2017 Youth World Championship

References

External links

1998 births
Living people
Danish male handball players
People from Kerteminde
Handball players at the 2020 Summer Olympics
Medalists at the 2020 Summer Olympics
Olympic silver medalists for Denmark
Olympic medalists in handball
Sportspeople from the Region of Southern Denmark